Frances Reid (December 9, 1914 – February 3, 2010) was an American  dramatic actress. Reid acted on television for nearly all of the second half of the 20th century. Her career continued into the early 2000s.

Although she starred in many productions, she is best known for her portrayal of Alice Horton on the NBC daytime soap opera Days of Our Lives from its debut in November 1965 until 2007. At the time of her death, she ranked fifth on the all-time list of longest-serving soap opera actors in the United States.

Biography
Reid grew up in Berkeley, California. Her acting career started in 1938 with a bit part in the movie Man-Proof.

Reid's Broadway debut was as Juliette Lecourtois in Where There's a Will There's a Way at the John Golden Theatre in 1939. She later played Roxane opposite Jose Ferrer's Cyrano in the 1946 Broadway production of Cyrano de Bergerac at the Alvin Theatre, repeating the role three years later, again opposite Ferrer, in a 1949 one-hour Philco Television Playhouse adaptation.

A member of The Actors Studio from its inception in 1947, Reid played a variety of stage roles throughout the 1940s and 1950s. From 1954 to 1955, Reid played the title role in the CBS television version of the radio serial Portia Faces Life.

She next portrayed the grasping Grace Baker, the mother-in-law of Penny Hughes, on As the World Turns from 1959 to 1962, and Rose Pollack, the kind-hearted mother of Nancy Pollock Karr, on The Edge of Night in 1964. Reid portrayed matriarch Alice Horton on NBC's Days of our Lives since the show's premiere on November 8, 1965. Reid gained mainstream attention for a 2003–2004 storyline in which Alice and several other long-running characters were seemingly murdered. Her last appearance on Days of our Lives was on December 26, 2007, although she remained on contract with the show until her death.

Reid made two guest appearances on Perry Mason starring Raymond Burr. In 1963 she played murderer Miss Givney, secretary to the guest attorney and episode's title character played by Bette Davis in "The Case of Constant Doyle." In 1965 she played defendant Lucille Forrest in "The Case of the Golden Venom."

In 1966, Reid appeared opposite Rock Hudson in the John Frankenheimer drama Seconds. In the audio commentary for the DVD version of the film, Frankenheimer called Reid one of his favorite actresses.

Reid played frontier Doctor Katy Piper on the Wagon Train episode "The Katy Piper Story", which aired on April 10, 1965.

Marriage
Reid was married to actor Philip Bourneuf from June 27, 1940, until their divorce in 1973. They had no children.

Death
Reid died in Beverly Hills, California, in an assisted living facility, aged 95, on February 3, 2010.

Awards
Nominated for a Daytime Emmy Award for Supporting Actress in 1979 and for Lead Actress in 1987, Reid was awarded a Daytime Emmy Lifetime Achievement Award in 2004. She won the Soap Opera Digest Award for Outstanding Actress in a Mature Role in 1978, 1979, 1984, and 1985, and was inducted into the Television Academy's archives in 2003.

Filmography 
 The Kurt Davos Story, Wagon Train (1962) as Florence Hastings
 The Andromeda Strain (1971) — Clara Dutton
 Seconds (1966) — Emily Hamilton

See also

 List of longest-serving soap opera actors

References

External links
 
 
 
 Frances Reid Archive of American Television Interview
 

1914 births
2010 deaths
20th-century American actresses
21st-century American actresses
Actresses from Berkeley, California
American film actresses
American soap opera actresses
American stage actresses
American television actresses
Daytime Emmy Award winners
Deaths from Alzheimer's disease
Deaths from dementia in California